Erwee is a South African surname. Notable people with the surname include:

 Bianca Erwee (born 1990), South African heptathlete
 Reinhardt Erwee (born 1988), South African rugby union player
 Sarel Erwee (born 1989), South African cricketer

Surnames of African origin